Olle Brudsten (born  in Söderhamn) is a Swedish curler and curling coach.

As a curler he is a 1988 Swedish mixed champion.

Teams

Mixed

Record as a coach of national teams

References

External links

Living people
1962 births
People from Söderhamn
Swedish male curlers
Swedish curling champions
Swedish curling coaches